Zeberkhan County is in Razavi Khorasan province, Iran. The capital of the county is the city of Qadamgah. At the 2006 census, the region's population (as Zeberkhan District of Nishapur County) was 54,576 in 14,714 households. The following census in 2011 counted 57,606 people in 17,418 households. At the 2016 census, the district's population was 56,635 in 18,312 households. It was separated from Nishapur County.

Administrative divisions

The population history of Zeberkhan County's administrative divisions over three consecutive censuses is shown in the following table.

References

Counties of Razavi Khorasan Province